Vailoppilly Sreehara Menon Memorial Government Vocational Higher Secondary School, commonly known as GVHSS, Ollur, is a vocational higher secondary school situated in Ollur, Thrissur City and run by the state government of Kerala, in India. It is named after the poet Vyloppilli Sreedhara Menon, who served as headmaster from 1936 to 1966.

History
The school was started in 1918 by St. Anthony's Forane Church, Ollur, and was later handed over to the government of Kerala. It is situated on 5.5 acres of land. Thrissur Municipal Corporation looks after the school's maintenance. The school celebrated its Golden Jubilee in 1968.

Notable alumni
 Mullanezhi, poet, lyricist and actor 
 Swami Ranganathananda, president of the Ramakrishna Math and Mission
 Eledath Thaikkattu Neelakandan Mooss, Ayurveda practitioner
 V. R. Krishnan Ezhuthachan, freedom fighter
 CG Janardhanan, Member of Kerala Legislature (Chalakudy)

References

 
High schools and secondary schools in Kerala
Educational institutions established in 1918
1918 establishments in India